Prince Ermias Sahle Selassie (born 14 June 1960 in Addis Ababa) is the only son of Prince Sahle Selassie of Ethiopia and Princess Mahisente Habte Mariam. He is the grandson of Emperor Haile Selassie of Ethiopia, and furthermore of Dejazmach Habte Mariam Gebre-Igziabiher, also known as Kumsa Moroda (Oromo: Kumsaa Morodaa) who was the third and last Moti, or ruler, of the Welega kingdom also referred as the Leqa Neqamte state. Moroda Bekere.  Currently the prince is ninth in the line of succession to the vacant imperial throne.

Education
Prince Ermias was educated in Ethiopia, Great Britain, and the United States. In England, he received his education at Old Ride Preparatory School, and then at Haileybury College. He obtained a BA degree in the social studies, with an emphasis in economics, from the University of California, in Santa Barbara. He continued his education at the Fletcher School of Law and Diplomacy between 1983 and 1985.

Prince Ermias is fluent in Amharic, English and German.

Family
Prince Ermias was first married on 9 June 1989 to Woizero Gelila Fesseha, daughter of Afe-Negus Fesseha Gabre-Selassie, a former Lord Chief Justice of Ethiopia, and by her is the father of twin sons:

 Prince Sahle-Selassie Ermias (known as Christian). Born on 20 February 1992.
 Prince Fesseha Zion Ermias (known as Rufael). Born on 20 February 1992.

Prince Ermias and his first wife later divorced in July 2004. On 25 February 2011, Prince Ermias married Woizero Saba Kebede. The Prince and his wife live in the Washington metropolitan area.

Royal function

Prince Ermias currently serves as the President of the Crown Council of Ethiopia in exile.  The Crown Council has pursued a mission devoted to the promoting a cultural and humanitarian role. Prince Ermias is also patron of the Haile Selassie Fund for Children in Need which continues to sponsor student scholarships, and the St. George of Lalibela Foundation.

On 16 September 2010, Prince Ermias delivered remarks at a briefing entitled "Traditional Leadership in the Modern World: Humanitarianism, Culture and the Diaspora" in the Rayburn House Office Building in Washington, D.C. This briefing was conducted by Representative Diane Watson, who was a member of the House Foreign Affairs Committee, and whose congressional district in Los Angeles includes Little Ethiopia. Empaneled with visiting royalty from Cameroon and the Kingdom of Swaziland (Princess Phindiwe Sangweni), Prince Ermias described the cultural leadership exercised by deposed and exiled royalty among members of ethnic communities living in either ancestral lands or diaspora in the United States and the United Kingdom.

Patronages 

 Founder of the Imperial Society of Saint George of Lalibela, Washington DC, 1998.
 Board Member of Tuition Credit Exchange Inc.
 Chairman Advisory Board of Bezant Corporation.
 Patron of the Haile Selassie Foundation for Ethiopia’s Children Inc.
 Patron for Africa for the Flying Hospital Charity.
 Director of the La Roche College (Pittsburgh).
 Member of the Board of the United States National Slavery Museum.
 Honorary Member Advisory Committee of the Angel Foundation.
 Member of the Luso-Ethiopian Friendship Association.

Honours

Orders of knighthood 
 Knight Grand Cross of the Royal Order of Francis I of the House of Bourbon-Two Sicilies.
 Knight Grand Collar of the Royal Order of the Drum (Rwandan Royal Family).
 Knight Grand Cordon of the Royal and Hashemite Order of the Pearl (Royal House of Sulu).

Awards 
 Golden Key of the City of Frankfort, Kentucky, United States, (29 May 2013) by Mayor Graham
 ISSA Silver Star Award (1997) by the International Strategic Studies Association for "Outstanding Contributions to Strategic Progress Through Humanitarian Achievement" for his work for Ethiopian refugees in Africa
 Medal of Merit of South Carolina, United States

Other honorifics 
 Knight Grand Cross of Justice of the Order of Saint Lazarus (Grand Priory of England) (12 December 2010).
 Knight Grand Cross of Merit of the Companionate of Merit of the Hospitaller Order of Saint Lazarus (Grand Prior of Ethiopia) (July 2013).

Ancestry

See also
Line of succession to the Ethiopian Throne

References

External links
 Biography at Ethiopian Crown Council website

1960 births
Living people
Ethiopian Royal Family
Ethiopian princes
Ethiopian anti-communists
Haile Selassie
Recipients of the Order of Saint Lazarus (statuted 1910)